Tiraspol Airport  is an airport located in Tiraspol. It previously served as a military air base.

The airport was attacked in 2022 while the Russian invasion of Ukraine was taking place. This was part of a series of attacks of unknown authorship that occurred in Transnistria in that year.

History 
Until 1989, it was used as a military airfield of the Soviet Air Forces. In 1991, work began on converting the airfield into a commercial airport, which would be the largest in Transnistria. These works were suspended due to the lack of funding and the political unsettledness of the status of Transnistria, which did not allow the customs and border services of the Republic of Moldova to be located at the airport and, consequently, to fly outside the country. Nevertheless, during the reconstruction of Chișinău International Airport in 1999–2000, the Tiraspol Airport was used to carry out regular flights, for which, according to the temporary scheme, the presence of the registration and customs-border service of Chișinău International Airport was organized at the Tiraspol Airport.

Until 2012, car races were held at the airfield. The airfield was used for training before the 2 September and 9 May parades.

In October 2012, Transnistrian President Yevgeny Shevchuk announced his intention to create a civilian airport in Tiraspol on the territory of a military airfield. The head of the delegation of the State Duma of Russia, Sergei Gavrilov, confirmed that the reconstruction would be paid with funds provided by Russia. In the same year, the runway was restored before the arrival of Russian military specialists.

On October 23, 2012, Russian Antonov An-72 aircraft landed in Tiraspol, marking the first flight since 1998. On October 25, 2012, the aircraft flew to Chișinău.

On May 10, 2016, Transnistrian President Shevchuk confirmed the intention to transform the Tiraspol airfield into a civilian airport, but indicated that "neither Moldova nor Ukraine are ready to give the appropriate permissions to transit through their territory or turn around through their territory."

2022 attack 
Following an attack on the security ministry building earlier in the same day, at 23:30 on 25 April 2022, the airport was attacked from the air, possibly by a drone strike; two explosives had been dropped on the air base of the airport. The windows and hood of a ZIL-131 truck were damaged. There also were reports on that day that a military unit of the Armed Forces of Transnistria had been attacked near Parcani. The Transnistrian authorities did not officially confirm the explosions in the Tiraspol Airport, which were initially reported by Moldova. It was later clarified that both reports referred to the same event at the air base in Tiraspol.

See also 
 List of airports in Transnistria

References

Notes

External links 

Defunct airports
Airports in Moldova
Tiraspol